Kevin Kling is an American storyteller and a commentator for National Public Radio.

Life and career
Kling grew up in Osseo, Minnesota, and graduated from Gustavus Adolphus College in 1979 with a Bachelor of Arts in Theatre. He began his career in the Twin Cities during the 1990s with two plays that wrote: 21A and Fear and Loving in Minneapolis. His one-man show Home and Away premiered at the Seattle Repertory Theatre and then moved to Second Stage Theatre (NYC) under the direction of David Esbjornson, also a Gustavus Adolphus College alumnus. Kling and Minneapolis-based accordionist and singer Simone Perrin have collaborated on two works, How? How? Why? Why? and Breakin' Hearts and Takin' Names.

In 1993, Kling won the Whiting Award for drama. In 2009, he won the A. P. Anderson Award for Outstanding Contributions to Literature and the Arts in Minnesota.

Kling has also made regular storytelling contributions to NPR’s All Things Considered. He has released several CD collections, including a boxed set, Collected Stories. His first published book of short stories was The Dog Says How followed by four more titles.

Kling has not been slowed in his work by a birth defect that shriveled his left arm and a motorcycle accident that completely paralyzed his right arm.

Plays
 21A
 Fear and Loving in Minneapolis
 Home and Away
 Lloyd's Prayer
 The Education of Walter Kauffman
 The Seven Dwarfs
 Hammer, Anvil and Stirrup
 Lilly's Purple Plastic Purse

Books
 The Dog Says How, Borealis Books, 2007
 Kevin Kling's Holiday Inn, Borealis Books, 2009
 Big Little Brother, Borealis Books, 2011
 Big Little Mother, Borealis Books, 2013
 On Stage with Kevin Kling, Minnesota Historical Society Press, 2013

Recordings
 1994 Home and Away
 2001 Stories Off the Shallow End
 2003 Wonderlure
 2004 A Fool's Paradise
 2004 Collected Stories
 2007 Alive
 2012 State Fair
 2014 Come & Get It

Awards
 1986 Heideman Best Short Play Award for 21A
 1993 Whiting Award
 2009 A.P. Anderson Award
 2010 Storytelling World Storytelling Collection, for "The Dog Says How" 
 2012  National Storytelling Network's Circle of Excellence Award

References

External links
 Official website
 "The Return of Kevin Kling: A Story of Near-Death and Recovery" - All Things Considered
 The Losses and the Laughter We Grow Into with Kevin Kling - On Being
 Popmatters: Stories off the Shallow End
Kevin Kling answers 9 questions, and, yes, Don Knotts would play him - Interview with the Twin Cities Pioneer Press newspaper

American storytellers
Gustavus Adolphus College alumni
NPR personalities
Year of birth missing (living people)
Living people
People from Osseo, Minnesota